Artemisia pallens, dhavanam from the Sanskrit name दमनक (damanaka),(), is an aromatic herb, In genus of small herbs or shrubs, xerophytic In nature. The flowers are racemose panicles, bear numerous small yellow flower heads or capitula, but the silvery white silky covering of down gives the foliage a grey or white appearance.

Dhavanam has alternate pinnasect leaves (leaf which is divided into opposite pairs of lobes cut almost to the midrib In narrow divisions) or palmatisect leaves (the green tissue is divided into several segments not fully separated At the base).

Cultivation
It is commercially cultivated for its fragrant leaves and flowers. It has two distinct morphological types, one in which the plants are short in stature and flowering sets in early, and the other in which plants are tall and flowering sets in later. It grows from seeds and cuttings and reaches maturity in four months. The plant is woody in the lower part of the stem, but with yearly branches. Seen mostly grown in Andhra Pradesh, Karnataka, Maharashtra and Tamil Nadu states in India.

Artemisia pallens is a preferred food for the larvae of a number of butterfly species.

Chemistry

Davanone, davan ether, davana furan and linalool are the major constituents of davana oil. Methyl cinnamate, ethyl cinnamate, bicyclogermacrene, 2-hydroxyisodavanone, farnesol, geranyl acetate, sesquiterpene lactones, and germacranolides are also found. The amount of davanone and linalool decreased while those of (Z)− and (E)−methyl cinnamate, (E)−ethyl cinnamate, bicyclogermacrene, davana ether, 2-hydroxyisodavanone, and farnesol increased from flower heads emergence stage to the initiation of seed set stage. Five compounds, (Z)− and (E)−methyl cinnamates, (Z)− and (E)−ethyl cinnamates, and geranyl acetate, were identified for the first time in davana oil.

Uses

The leaves and flowers yield an essential oil known as oil of Davana. Several species yield essential oil and some are used as fodder, some of them are a source of the anthelmintic chemical santonin. Davana blossoms are offered to Shiva, the God of Transformation, by the faithful, and decorate his altar throughout the day. Oral administration of high doses aqueous/methanolic extract from the aerial parts of the plants was observed to reduce blood glucose levels in glucose−fed hyperglycemic and alloxan-treated rabbits and rats.

Uses of Davana oil
Davana oil is used in making perfumes of sweet and fruity fragrances.
Davana leaves and stalks are used in making bouquets, garlands, fresh or dry flower arrangements.

References

pallens
Herbs
Medicinal plants of Asia
Perfume ingredients
Essential oils
Plants described in 1838